Litlanesfoss is a waterfall in Hengifossá in Fljótsdalur, Eastern Iceland, also known as Stuðlabergsfoss . The waterfall is about 30 meters high and forms an apron in a cliff.  The waterfall is in a large rock choir with an unusually regular supporting rock made of high and straight columns.

See also 

 List of waterfalls in Iceland

References 

Waterfalls of Iceland